Events from the year 1566 in art.

Events
August 10 - Beeldenstorm: At the end of a pilgrimage from Hondschoote to Steenvoorde, the chapel of the Sint-Laurensklooster is defaced by a crowd.  It is the start of a period of several weeks of violent iconoclasm in which paintings and church decorations and fittings are destroyed throughout the Low Countries. 
 Pieter Bruegel the Elder begins painting The Massacre of the Innocents (1566-1567).
 Giuseppe Arcimboldo returns to the Italian city-states.
 An epitaph to Elisabeth of Brandenburg, Duchess of Brunswick-Calenberg-Göttingen, designed by Sigmund Linger, is erected in the St. Giles Chapel of the St. John's Church in Schleusingen.

Paintings
[[Image:Pieter Brueghel der Jüngere - Bethlehemitische Kindermord.jpg|thumb|right|300px|Pieter Bruegel the Elder, The Massacre of the Innocents, c.1566-1567]]
 Giuseppe ArcimboldoThe JuristThe Librarian (approximate date)Water or Fish (The Four Elements; Kunsthistorisches Museum Vienna
 Pieter Bruegel the Elder - The Census at Bethlehem Antoine Caron - The Massacres of the Triumvirate Hans Eworth - Nicholas Heath, Archbishop of York Paolo Veronese - altarpiece of Jesus' baptism, at the cathedral of Lignano Sabbiadoro

Births
January 15 - Philipp Uffenbach, German painter and etcher (died 1636)date unknownGiovanni Baglione, Italian early baroque painter and historian of art (died 1643)
Abraham Bloemaert, Dutch painter and printmaker (died 1651)
Domenico Carpinoni, Italian painter of primarily religious works (died 1658)
Johann Matthias Kager, German painter (died 1634)
Santo Peranda, a historical painter of Venice (died 1638)
Joachim Wtewael, Dutch painter and engraver (died 1638)

Deaths
April 4 - Daniele da Volterra, Italian mannerist painter and sculptor (born c.1509)
April 16 - Juan Correa de Vivar, Spanish Renaissance (Renacimiento) painter (born c.1510) 
August - Lambert Lombard, Flemish Renaissance painter, architect and theorist for the Prince-Bishopric of Liège (born 1505)
August 4 - Girolamo della Robbia, Italian ceramicist (born 1488)date unknownAhmed Karahisari, Ottoman calligrapher (born 1468)probable'' 
Niccolò Boldrini, Italian engraver (born c.1500)
Girolamo Romanino, Italian painter (born c.1485)
Jan Sanders van Hemessen, Flemish Northern Renaissance painter (born c.1500)

References

 
Years of the 16th century in art